Five on Eight is the only album featuring drummer Rufus "Speedy" Jones as leader.

Recording and music
Drummer Rufus "Speedy" Jones led a quintet in the period 1963–64; this led to the recording of Five on Eight. The album was produced by Elliot Mezer.

Release and reception
The album was released by Cameo Records. It was Jones's only album as leader. Billboard gave it a three-star review.

Track listing
"I Long for Your Love" – 3:12
"My Special Dream" – 3:50
"Theme from 'The Prize'" – 4:00
"Ebb Tide" – 2:27
"Bird Brain" – 3:45
"Just About That Time" – 3:02
"A Secret" – 4:47
"Rollin'" – 5:35
"Aluminum Baby" – 4:27

Personnel
Seldon Powell – tenor sax (tracks 1–5)
Joe Farrell – tenor sax (tracks 6–9)
Tommy Turrentine – trumpet (tracks 6–9)
Jaki Byard – piano (tracks 6–9)
Gene Bertoncini – guitar
Major Holley – bass (tracks 1–5)
Teddy Smith – bass (tracks 6–9)
Rufus Jones – drums

References

Cameo-Parkway Records albums